Piletocera costipunctata is a moth in the family Crambidae. It was described by Warren in 1896. It is found in  India (Meghalaya).

References

costipunctata
Endemic fauna of India
Moths of Asia
Moths described in 1896